is a Japanese retired football player who last played for Vissel Kobe.

Playing career
Nasu was born in Minamisatsuma on 10 October 1981. When he was a Komazawa University student, he joined J1 League club Yokohama F. Marinos in 2002. Although he is originally a center back, he became a regular player as defensive midfielder under new manager Takeshi Okada from 2003 and was selected Rookie of the Year award in 2003. Marinos won the champions for 2 years in a row (2003-2004). However his opportunity to play decreased from 2006. In 2008, he moved to Tokyo Verdy. He played as regular player as his originally position, center back. However Verdy finished at the 17th place and was relegated to J2 League. In 2009, he moved to Júbilo Iwata. He played as regular player as center back in 2009 and as defensive midfielder in 2010. Júbilo also won the champions in 2010 J.League Cup. He also played as left side back from summer 2011. In 2012, he moved to Kashiwa Reysol. Although his opportunity to play decreased, he played many matches side back and center back. Reysol also won the champions in Emperor's Cup. In 2013, he moved to Urawa Reds. He became a regular center back and scored 9 goals in 2013 season. He was also selected Best Eleven award in 2013. From 2016, his opportunity to play decreased behind new player Wataru Endo. In 2018, he moved to Vissel Kobe.

Nasu retired at the end of the 2019 season.

National team career
In June 2001, Nasu was selected Japan U-20 national team for 2001 World Youth Championship. But he did not play in the match. In August 2004, he was selected Japan U-23 national team for 2004 Summer Olympics and he named a captain. He played 2 matches.

Club statistics

1Includes Japanese Super Cup, A3 Champions Cup and J.League Championship.

National team career statistics

Honours

Club
Yokohama F. Marinos
J1 League (2) : 2003, 2004

Júbilo Iwata
J.League Cup (1) : 2010
Suruga Bank Championship (1) : 2011

Kashiwa Reysol
Emperor's Cup (1) : 2012
Japanese Super Cup (1) : 2012

Urawa Red Diamonds
J.League Cup (1) : 2016
AFC Champions League (1): 2017

Individual
 J.League Rookie of the Year : 2003

References

External links

Profile at Urawa Reds
Profile at Vissel Kobe

1981 births
Living people
Komazawa University alumni
Association football people from Kagoshima Prefecture
Japanese footballers
J1 League players
Yokohama F. Marinos players
Tokyo Verdy players
Júbilo Iwata players
Kashiwa Reysol players
Urawa Red Diamonds players
Vissel Kobe players
Olympic footballers of Japan
Footballers at the 2004 Summer Olympics
Asian Games medalists in football
Footballers at the 2002 Asian Games
Asian Games silver medalists for Japan
Association football defenders
Medalists at the 2002 Asian Games